Succinaldehyde or succindialdehyde is an organic compound with the formula (CH2CHO)2.  Typical of other dialdehydes, succinaldehyde is highly reactive and is rarely observed as the dialdehyde.  Usually, it is handled as the hydrates or methanol-derived acetal.  It is a precursor to tropinone.  Succinaldehyde can used as a crosslinking agent for proteins, but it is less widely used than the related dialdehyde glutaraldehyde.

Preparation and reactions

Succinaldehyde is generated by the oxidation of tetrahydrofuran with chlorine followed by hydrolysis of the chlorinated product. It can also be prepared by the hydroformylation of acrolein or the acetals thereof.  

In aqueous solution, succinaldehyde quickly converts to the cyclic hydrate.  In methanol it converts to the cyclic acetal, 2,5-dimethoxyltetrahydrofuran.

References 

Aldehydes